Territorial Assembly elections were held in Moyen-Congo on 31 March 1957. The Democratic Union for the Defence of African Interests and the African Socialist Movement both won 17 seats. Voter turnout was 74.2%.

Results
The parties were in two broad coalitions; the coalition led by the African Socialist Movement (MSA) won 23 seats, 17 taken by the MSA, two by the Congolese Progressive Party and French Section of the Workers' International and one by the Democratic and Socialist Union of the Resistance and the Rally of the French People. The Democratic Union for the Defence of African Interests–Moyen-Congo Union (UDDIA–UMC) alliance won 22 seats, with 17 taken by the UDDIA and five by the UMC. In Kouliou, the UDDIA–UMC coalition ran as the Union for the Defence of Kouilou.

References

Congo
1957 in Moyen-Congo
Elections in the Republic of the Congo